Fernande is a predominantly French language feminine given name. It is the feminine form of the masculine given name Fernand. People bearing the name Fernande include:

Fernande Albany (1889–1966), French actress
Fernande Arendt (1891–), Belgian tennis player
Fernande Baetens (1901–1977), Belgian jurist and feminist
Fernande Barrey (1893–1960), French artist's model and painter
Fernande Bayetto (1928–2015), French alpine skier
Fernande Bochatay (born 1946), Swiss alpine skier
Fernande Brosseau, Canadian social activist
Fernande Caroen (1920–1998), Belgian freestyle swimmer
Fernande Decruck (1896–1954), French composer
Fernande R.V. Duffly (born 1949), Indonesian-American lawyer and jurist
Fernande Giroux, Canadian actress and jazz singer
Fernande Grudet (also known as Madame Claude; 1923–2015), French brothel keeper
Fernande Keufgens (also known as Fernande Davis), Belgian World War II resistance member
Fernande de Mertens (1850–1924), Belgian-French painter 
Fernande Olivier (1881–1966), French artist's model painter
Fernande Sadler (1869–1949), French painter and engraver
Fernande Saint-Martin (1927–2019), Canadian art critic, museologist, semiologist, visual arts theorist and writer
Fernande Tassy (1903–1952), French fencer
Fernande Tchétché (born 1988), Ivorian footballer

References 

French feminine given names
Feminine given names